First Lady or First Gentleman of Honduras is the title attributed to the spouse of the president of Honduras, concurrent with the president's term of office. The title is currently held by Manuel Zelaya, the husband of President Xiomara Castro.

List of first ladies and first gentleman

See also
 

 
Honduras politics-related lists
Honduras
Lists of Honduran people